Brooke Allison Adams (born September 26, 1986), better known as Brooke Allison, is an American singer from Fort Worth, Texas, USA, who had a minor hit in 2001 with "The Kiss-Off (Goodbye)". She was later part of the girl group The Beach Girl5.

Early life
Born in Lampasas and raised in Fort Worth, Allison attended Harvest Christian Academy in Watauga. She later moved to Los Angeles, where she befriended Michael Jackson. She competed in the World Championships of Performing Arts in Burbank. She started singing at the age of three and after performing at DARE rallies aged ten, she built up a following via the internet after a friend set up a website for her and uploaded MP3s. This led to a record deal with 2KSounds, a division of Virgin Records.

Career
In 2001, Allison's first single from her self-titled album, "The Kiss-Off (Goodbye)", peaked at number 28 on Billboard magazine's Hot Singles Sales chart. She toured with 98 Degrees on their Revelation tour in 2001.<ref name="Lalley">Lalley, Heather (2001) "98 Degrees welcomed with screams", The Spokesman-Review", May 11, 2001.</ref> Her first album, Brooke Allison, which featured songwriting contributions from Mýa, Robert Palmer, and Meredith Brooks, was released in June that year on 2KSounds/Virgin. The album received negative reviews, with the Knight Ridder calling it "a classic exhibit of the pop music industry's assembly-line tendencies". She was recruited by AOL as a "Growing Up Advisor" for its Kids Only channel.

Grammy Award-nominated record producer Michael Blakey produced four of Allison's songs for the original motion picture soundtrack Cinderella II: Dreams Come True and Disney's Princess Favorites.Pearlman, Cindy (2002) "Texas girl turns Disney princess", Chicago Sun-Times, February 26, 2002. She planned to follow her debut with a rock album, but it never materialized.

In 2008, she successfully auditioned to become a member of the new girl group called The Beach Girl5 along with Mandy Jiroux, Laura New, Dominique Domingo and Noreen Juliano. She went on tour with the BG5 in Europe and in the US. They released the single SCRATCH and appeared on the show Keeping Up with the Kardashians. After releasing two singles with the group, the group disbanded.

In August 2018, Brooke experienced medical issues and fell into a coma. Her family set up a GoFundMe to raise money for her care. It is listed under the name "Brooke Adams recovery fund". As of 2021, she remains in a vegetative state.

Discography
As solo singer
Albums
 Brooke Allison (2001), 2KSounds/Virgin

Singles
 "The Kiss-Off (Goodbye)" (2001), 2KSounds/Virgin – (US #28-Sales Chart)
 "Thought You Might Wanna Know" (2001)

With The Beach Girl5
EPs
 Beach Girl5'' (2009)

Singles
 "Unbreakable" (2009)
 "Scratch" (2010)
 "Lay A Little Sunshine" (2011)

References

Living people
1986 births
People from Odessa, Texas
American women pop singers
Virgin Records artists
21st-century American women singers
21st-century American singers
People from Lampasas, Texas